Yanzhuang is a town of Song County in the Qin Mountains of western Henan province, China, located about  north of the county seat. , it has 21 villages under its administration.

See also 
 List of township-level divisions of Henan

References 

Township-level divisions of Henan
Luoyang